Juniata Township may refer to the following places in the United States:

 Juniata Township, Michigan
 Juniata Township, Adams County, Nebraska
 Juniata Township, Bedford County, Pennsylvania
 Juniata Township, Blair County, Pennsylvania
 Juniata Township, Huntingdon County, Pennsylvania
 Juniata Township, Perry County, Pennsylvania

Township name disambiguation pages